This is a list of mathematical logic topics, by Wikipedia page.

For traditional syllogistic logic, see the list of topics in logic. See also the list of computability and complexity topics for more theory of algorithms.

Working foundations

Peano axioms
Giuseppe Peano
Mathematical induction
Structural induction
Recursive definition
Naive set theory
Element (mathematics)
Ur-element
Singleton (mathematics)
Simple theorems in the algebra of sets
Algebra of sets
Power set
Empty set
Non-empty set
Empty function
Universe (mathematics)
Axiomatization
Axiomatic system
Axiom schema
Axiomatic method
Formal system
Mathematical proof
Direct proof
Reductio ad absurdum
Proof by exhaustion
Constructive proof
Nonconstructive proof
Tautology
Consistency proof
Arithmetization of analysis
Foundations of mathematics
Formal language
Principia Mathematica
Hilbert's program
Impredicative
Definable real number
Algebraic logic
Boolean algebra (logic)
Dialectica space
categorical logic

Model theory

Finite model theory
Descriptive complexity theory
Model checking
Trakhtenbrot's theorem
Computable model theory
Tarski's exponential function problem
Undecidable problem
Institutional model theory
Institution (computer science)
Non-standard analysis
Non-standard calculus
Hyperinteger
Hyperreal number
Transfer principle
Overspill
Elementary Calculus: An Infinitesimal Approach
Criticism of non-standard analysis
Standard part function
Set theory
Forcing (mathematics)
Boolean-valued model
Kripke semantics
General frame
Predicate logic
First-order logic
Infinitary logic
Many-sorted logic
Higher-order logic
Lindström quantifier
Second-order logic
Soundness theorem
Gödel's completeness theorem
Original proof of Gödel's completeness theorem
Compactness theorem
Löwenheim–Skolem theorem
Skolem's paradox
Gödel's incompleteness theorems
Structure (mathematical logic)
Interpretation (logic)
Substructure (mathematics)
Elementary substructure
Skolem hull
Non-standard model
Atomic model (mathematical logic)
Prime model
Saturated model
Existentially closed model
Ultraproduct
Age (model theory)
Amalgamation property
Hrushovski construction
Potential isomorphism
Theory (mathematical logic)
Complete theory
Vaught's test
Morley's categoricity theorem
Stability spectrum
Morley rank
Stable theory
Forking extension
Strongly minimal theory
Stable group
Tame group
o-minimal theory
Weakly o-minimal structure
C-minimal theory
Spectrum of a theory
Vaught conjecture
Model complete theory
List of first-order theories
Conservative extension
Elementary class
Pseudoelementary class
Strength (mathematical logic)
Differentially closed field
Exponential field
Ax–Grothendieck theorem
Ax–Kochen theorem
Peano axioms
Non-standard model of arithmetic
First-order arithmetic
Second-order arithmetic
Presburger arithmetic
Wilkie's theorem
Functional predicate
T-schema
Back-and-forth method
Barwise compactness theorem
Skolemization
Lindenbaum–Tarski algebra
Löb's theorem
Arithmetical set
Definable set
Ehrenfeucht–Fraïssé game
Herbrand interpretation / Herbrand structure
Imaginary element
Indiscernibles
Interpretation (model theory) / Interpretable structure
Pregeometry (model theory)
Quantifier elimination
Reduct
Signature (logic)
Skolem normal form
Type (model theory)
Zariski geometry

Set theory
 Algebra of sets  
 Axiom of choice  
 Axiom of countable choice  
 Axiom of dependent choice  
 Zorn's lemma  
 Boolean algebra (structure)
 Boolean-valued model  
 Burali-Forti paradox  
 Cantor's back-and-forth method  
 Cantor's diagonal argument  
 Cantor's first uncountability proof  
 Cantor's theorem  
 Cantor–Bernstein–Schroeder theorem  
 Cardinality  
 Aleph number  
 Aleph-null  
 Aleph-one  
 Beth number  
 Cardinal number  
 Hartogs number  
 Cartesian product  
 Class (set theory)  
 Complement (set theory)  
 Complete Boolean algebra  
 Continuum (set theory)  
 Suslin's problem  
 Continuum hypothesis  
 Countable set  
 Descriptive set theory  
 Analytic set  
 Analytical hierarchy  
 Borel equivalence relation  
 Infinity-Borel set  
 Lightface analytic game  
 Perfect set property  
 Polish space  
 Prewellordering  
 Projective set  
 Property of Baire  
 Uniformization (set theory)  
 Universally measurable set  
 Determinacy  
 AD+  
 Axiom of determinacy  
 Axiom of projective determinacy  
 Axiom of real determinacy  
 Empty set  
 Forcing (mathematics)  
 Fuzzy set  
 Internal set theory  
 Intersection (set theory)  
 L  
 L(R)  
 Large cardinal property  
 Musical set theory  
 Ordinal number  
 Infinite descending chain  
 Limit ordinal  
 Successor ordinal  
 Transfinite induction  
∈-induction  
 Well-founded set  
 Well-order  
 Power set  
 Russell's paradox  
 Set theory  
 Alternative set theory  
 Axiomatic set theory  
 Kripke–Platek set theory with urelements  
 Morse–Kelley set theory  
 Naive set theory  
 New Foundations  
 Positive set theory  
 Zermelo–Fraenkel set theory  
 Zermelo set theory  
 Set (mathematics)  
 Simple theorems in the algebra of sets  
 Subset  
 Θ (set theory)  
 Tree (descriptive set theory)  
 Tree (set theory)  
 Union (set theory)  
 Von Neumann universe  
 Zero sharp

Descriptive set theory

Analytical hierarchy

Large cardinals

Almost Ramsey cardinal
Erdős cardinal
Extendible cardinal
Huge cardinal
Hyper-Woodin cardinal
Inaccessible cardinal
Ineffable cardinal
Mahlo cardinal
Measurable cardinal
N-huge cardinal
Ramsey cardinal
Rank-into-rank
Remarkable cardinal
Shelah cardinal
Strong cardinal
Strongly inaccessible cardinal
Subtle cardinal
Supercompact cardinal
Superstrong cardinal
Totally indescribable cardinal
Weakly compact cardinal
Weakly hyper-Woodin cardinal
Weakly inaccessible cardinal
Woodin cardinal
Unfoldable cardinal

Recursion theory

Entscheidungsproblem
Decision problem
Decidability (logic)
Church-Turing thesis
Computable function
Algorithm
Recursion
Primitive recursive function
Mu operator
Ackermann function
Turing machine
Halting problem
Computability theory, computation
Herbrand Universe
Markov algorithm
Lambda calculus
Church-Rosser theorem
Calculus of constructions
Combinatory logic
Post correspondence problem
Kleene's recursion theorem
Recursively enumerable set
Recursively enumerable language
Decidable language
Undecidable language
Rice's theorem
Post's theorem
Turing degree
Effective results in number theory
Diophantine set
Matiyasevich's theorem
Word problem for groups
Arithmetical hierarchy
Subrecursion theory
Presburger arithmetic
Computational complexity theory
Polynomial time
Exponential time
Complexity class
Complexity classes P and NP
Cook's theorem
List of complexity classes
Polynomial hierarchy
Exponential hierarchy
NP-complete
Time hierarchy theorem
Space hierarchy theorem
Natural proof
Hypercomputation
Oracle machine
Rózsa Péter
Alonzo Church
Emil Post
Alan Turing
Jacques Herbrand
Haskell Curry
Stephen Cole Kleene
Definable real number

Proof theory

Metamathematics
Cut-elimination
Tarski's undefinability theorem
Diagonal lemma
Provability logic
Interpretability logic
Sequent
Sequent calculus
Analytic proof
Structural proof theory
Self-verifying theories
Substructural logics
Structural rule
Weakening
Contraction
Linear logic
Intuitionistic linear logic
Proof net
Affine logic
Strict logic
Relevant logic
Proof-theoretic semantics
Ludics
System F
Gerhard Gentzen
Gentzen's consistency proof
Reverse mathematics
Nonfirstorderizability
Interpretability
Weak interpretability
Cointerpretability
Tolerant sequence
Cotolerant sequence
Deduction theorem
Cirquent calculus

Mathematical constructivism

Nonconstructive proof
Existence theorem
 Intuitionistic logic
 Intuitionistic type theory
 Type theory
 Lambda calculus
 Church–Rosser theorem
 Simply typed lambda calculus
 Typed lambda calculus
 Curry–Howard isomorphism
 Calculus of constructions
 Constructivist analysis
 Lambda cube
 System F
Introduction to topos theory
LF (logical framework)
Computability logic
Computable measure theory
Finitism
Ultraintuitionism
Luitzen Egbertus Jan Brouwer

Modal logic

Kripke semantics
Sahlqvist formula
Interior algebra

Theorem provers

First-order resolution
Automated theorem proving
ACL2 theorem prover
E equational theorem prover
Gandalf theorem prover
HOL theorem prover
Isabelle theorem prover
LCF theorem prover
Otter theorem prover
Paradox theorem prover
Vampire theorem prover
Interactive proof system
Mizar system
QED project
Coq

Discovery systems

Automated Mathematician
Eurisko

Historical

Begriffsschrift
Systems of Logic Based on Ordinals – Alan Turing's Ph.D. thesis

See also

Kurt Gödel
Alfred Tarski
Saharon Shelah

Logic
 L
Mathematical logic
Mathematical logic
Mathematical logic